Mahatma Gandhi University, Nalgonda is a public university located at Nalgonda district, Telangana, India.

History
The university is a state university, established in 2007 by the Government of Andhra Pradesh. It was formerly called as Nalgonda University. It is a self-funded public university. It has an engineering college established in 2013 located in panagal, Nalgonda. The Government of Andhra Pradesh established Nalgonda University in the year 2007 vide Government Orders in G.O.19/HE (UE-II) Department, dt: 13/3/2007 by suitably amending the Andhra Pradesh Universities Act 1991 under Section-3(1) in L.A.Bill No.4 of 2007. The establishment of this university is part of the vision of the Government of Andhra Pradesh to promote access, equity and inclusiveness in Higher Education and foundation stone laid by former Chief Minister YS Rajsekar Reddy.

This University has been renamed by the Government of Andhra Pradesh as Mahatma Gandhi University by amending the Schedule of Act 4 of 1991, which was published in the A.P. Gazette on April 28, 2008. The University Headquarters were located in Nalgonda town during the reporting year 2010-11 and its permanent campus is being developed in 240 acres of land allotted to the University on the state highway (Nalgonda – Narketpally) at Anneparthy, 7 km from Nalgonda town.

Infrastructure
It is located on a 300-acre area at Nalgonda town. And it has a 16-acre engineering college located in panagal, Nalgonda.

See also
 List of universities in India
 Universities and colleges in India
 Education in India

References

External links
  of Mahatma Gandhi University, Nalgonda.

Nizamabad district

2007 establishments in Andhra Pradesh
Educational institutions established in 2007
State universities in Telangana